"Can I Trust You With My Heart" is a song co-written and recorded by American country music singer Travis Tritt.  It was released in November 1992 as the second single released his CD T-R-O-U-B-L-E.  The song reached the top of the Billboard Hot Country Singles & Tracks (now Hot Country Songs) chart.  The song was written by Tritt and Stewart Harris.

Content
The narrator first explains how special it is in falling in love with a person of the opposite sex, and the difficulties that can occasionally arise with it. He then elaborates on his own relationship with a significant other and goes on to explain that while he has developed a trust in her, he wonders if that trust is good enough to advance in spending the remainder of his life with her, especially if their relationship will ultimately result in marriage.

Critical reception
Geoffrey Himes, of Billboard magazine reviewed the song favorably, calling it "a tear-in-your-beer ballad."

Music video
The music video was directed by Jack Cole, and premiered in late 1992. It is almost entirely in black and white, save for a love scene in a motel room which is in color.

Personnel
Per liner notes
Sam Bacco - timpani, cymbals, crotales, tambourine
Mike Brignardello - bass guitar
Larry Byrom - acoustic guitar
Terry Crisp - baritone steel guitar
Jack Holder - electric guitar
Billy Livsey - Hammond organ, harmonium
Dana McVicker - backing vocals
Hargus "Pig" Robbins - piano
Travis Tritt - vocals
Steve Turner - drums
Billy Joe Walker Jr. - acoustic guitar, slide guitar
Reggie Young - electric guitar

Chart performance
The song debuted at number 62 on the Hot Country Singles & Tracks chart dated December 5, 1992. It spent twenty weeks on that chart and reached Number One on the chart dated February 13, 1993, remaining there for two weeks, marking Tritt's third Number One.

Charts

Year-end charts

References

1992 singles
Travis Tritt songs
Songs written by Travis Tritt
Warner Records singles
Songs written by Stewart Harris
1992 songs